Labaya (also transliterated as Labayu or Lib'ayu) was a 14th-century BCE ruler or warlord in the central hill country of southern Canaan. He lived contemporaneously with Pharaoh Akhenaten. Labaya is mentioned in several of the Amarna Letters (abbreviated "EA", for 'el Amarna'). He is the author of letters EA 252–54.

Labaya was active over the whole length of Samaria and slightly beyond, as he gave land to Habiru in the vicinity of Šakmu (Shechem) and he and his sons threatened such powerful towns as Jerusalem and Gazru (Gezer) to the south, and Megiddo to the north.

Career

The Amarna letters give an incomplete look at Labaya's career. In the first of Labaya's letters thus far discovered (EA 252), he defends himself to the Pharaoh against complaints of other city rulers about him, for example, the complaint that he has hired mercenaries from among the  Habiru. Labaya further admitted to having invaded Gezer and insulting its king Milkilu. He denied any knowledge of his son's alleged collaboration with the Habiru:

Other Canaanite rulers, such as Abdi-Heba of Jerusalem, complained of Labaya's depredations (e.g. EA 289) but note that in later years, Abdi-Heba would himself be referred to as "another Labaya" in EA 280. Labaya was accused of capturing cities that were under Egyptian protection. Biridiya, the king of Megiddo, accused him of besieging his city:

After receiving numerous complaints about Labaya's behavior, the pharaoh (probably Amenhotep III) finally ordered several Canaanite rulers to take Labaya prisoner and send him to Egypt. Biridiya, ruler of Megiddo, wrote to the pharaoh that Zurata, governor of Akko, had captured Labaya, but accepted a bribe from the latter and released him (EA 245).

Labaya was eventually killed by the citizens of Gina (Beth-Hagan, possibly modern-day Jenin). His death was reported to the Pharaoh's agent, Balu-Ur-Sag, by Labaya's two sons. The sons of Labaya continued to campaign against other Egyptian vassals in Canaan. One of Labaya's sons, Mutbaal, ruled Pella in the Trans-Jordanian part of Canaan. Biryawaza, king of Damascus, was eventually asked to take armed action against Labaya's sons (EA 250).

List of Labaya's three letters to Pharaoh

Labaya's name is referenced in fourteen el Amarna letters and his name used thirty-two times. He was the author of letters EA 252–254.

EA 252–title: "Sparing one's enemies"
EA 253–title: "Neither rebel nor delinquent (1)"
EA 254–title: "Neither rebel nor delinquent (2)"'

Identifications with biblical figures
Some researchers, such as Richard Abbott, note the possibility that Labaya and the biblical figure of Abimelech ben Gideon, from Judges 9, were identical.

Still others, such as David Rohl, have advocated a totally revised chronology of ancient Israelite and Egyptian history, and instead identify Labaya with Saul, and Mutbaal with Saul's son Ishbaal. Ish-baal and Mutbaal, whose names have the same meaning, "Man of Baal", moved their capital to Transjordan after the death of their fathers, whose center of power had been west of the Jordan river. Rohl further identifies Dadua, Ayab and Yishaya, three figures mentioned by Mutbaal in a later Amarna Letter, with King David, his general Joab and David's father Jesse. The Rohl chronology is not, however, widely accepted. Rohl's suggestions are rejected by other Egyptologists, such as Kenneth Kitchen, who argue that there are discrepancies between the Labaya of the Amarna texts and King Saul as he is described in the Books of Samuel.

References

Bibliography

External links
Abimelech, Saul, and Amarna - Abimelech and Labayu 
Saul and Labayu - are they the same person? 
Arguments identifying Labaya with Saul
The Revision of Ancient History - A Perspective
Amarna Letters Concerning the Labaya Affair

14th-century BC rulers
Amarna letters writers
Canaanite people
Habiru
Hebrew Bible
Monarchs killed in action